The Allianz Cup was a tournament for professional female tennis players. The event, played on outdoor clay courts, was classified as a $25,000 ITF Women's Circuit tournament in its final year and was held in Sofia, Bulgaria. It was a $100,000 event for four years in a row until it was downgraded in 2012. The first edition was held in 1991.

Past finals

Singles

Doubles

External links

Official website 
ITF search

ITF Women's World Tennis Tour
Clay court tennis tournaments
Tennis tournaments in Bulgaria
Recurring sporting events established in 1996
Sports competitions in Sofia
Recurring sporting events disestablished in 2018
Defunct sports competitions in Bulgaria